Truncatella may refer to:

 Truncatella (gastropod), a genus of shoreline gastropods
 Truncatella (fungus), a genus of plant pathogens